is a rural district located in southeastern Yamanashi Prefecture, Japan.

As of July 2012, the district had an estimated population of 48,832 and a population density of 116 persons per km2. The total area was 420.78 km2.

The district formerly included the cities of Fujiyoshida, Tsuru and a portion of the city of Uenohara. It currently consists of the following two towns and four villages:
Fujikawaguchiko
Nishikatsura
Dōshi
Narusawa
Oshino
Yamanakako

History

Minamitsuru District was founded during the early Meiji period establishment of the municipalities system on July 22, 1878 and initially consisted of 21 villages.

Recent mergers
On November 15, 2003 - the town of Kawaguchiko, and the villages of Katsuyama and Ashiwada merged to form the town of Fujikawaguchiko
On February 13, 2005 - the village of Akiyama merged with the town of Uenohara, from Kitatsuru District, to form the new city of Uenohara.
On March 1, 2006 - the town of Fujikawaguchiko absorbed parts of the village of Kamikuishiki, from Nishiyatsushiro District.

Districts in Yamanashi Prefecture
1878 establishments in Japan